The FreeBSD Documentation License is the license that covers most of the documentation for the FreeBSD operating system.

License
The license is very similar to the 2-clause Simplified BSD License used by the support of FreeBSD, however, it makes the applications of "source code" and "compile" less obscure in the context of documentation. It also includes an obligatory disclaimer about IEEE and Open Group manuscript in some old-fashioned sheets.

<nowiki>
The FreeBSD Documentation License

Copyright 1994-2015 The FreeBSD Project. All rights reserved.

Redistribution and use in source (SGML DocBook) and 'compiled' forms (SGML, HTML, PDF, PostScript, 
RTF and so forth) with or without modification, are permitted provided that the following conditions are 
met:

    1. Redistributions of source code (SGML DocBook) must retain the above copyright notice, this list of 
       conditions and the following disclaimer as the first lines of this file unmodified.

    2. Redistributions in compiled form (transformed to other DTDs, converted to PDF, PostScript, RTF 
       and other formats) must reproduce the above copyright notice, this list of conditions and the 
       following disclaimer in the documentation and/or other materials provided with the distribution.

THIS DOCUMENTATION IS PROVIDED BY THE FREEBSD DOCUMENTATION PROJECT "AS IS" 
AND ANY EXPRESS OR IMPLIED WARRANTIES, INCLUDING, BUT NOT LIMITED TO, THE IMPLIED WARRANTIES OF 
MERCHANTABILITY AND FITNESS FOR A PARTICULAR PURPOSE ARE DISCLAIMED. IN NO EVENT SHALL 
THE FREEBSD DOCUMENTATION PROJECT BE LIABLE FOR ANY DIRECT, INDIRECT, INCIDENTAL, SPECIAL, 
EXEMPLARY, OR CONSEQUENTIAL DAMAGES (INCLUDING, BUT NOT LIMITED TO, PROCUREMENT OF 
SUBSTITUTE GOODS OR SERVICES; LOSS OF USE, DATA, OR PROFITS; OR BUSINESS INTERRUPTION) 
HOWEVER CAUSED AND ON ANY THEORY OF LIABILITY, WHETHER IN CONTRACT, STRICT LIABILITY, OR 
TORT (INCLUDING NEGLIGENCE OR OTHERWISE) ARISING IN ANY WAY OUT OF THE USE OF THIS 
DOCUMENTATION, EVEN IF ADVISED OF THE POSSIBILITY OF SUCH DAMAGE.
Manual Pages

Manual Pages

Some FreeBSD manual pages contain text from the IEEE Std 1003.1, 2004 Edition, Standard for 
Information Technology -- Portable Operating System Interface (POSIX®) specification. These manual 
pages are subject to the following terms:

    The Institute of Electrical and Electronics Engineers and The Open Group, have given us 
    permission to reprint portions of their documentation.

    In the following statement, the phrase ``this text'' refers to portions of the system 
    documentation.

    Portions of this text are reprinted and reproduced in electronic form in the FreeBSD manual 
    pages, from IEEE Std 1003.1, 2004 Edition, Standard for Information Technology -- 
    Portable Operating System Interface (POSIX), The Open Group Base Specifications Issue 
    6, Copyright (C) 2001-2004 by the Institute of Electrical and Electronics Engineers, Inc and 
    The Open Group. In the event of any discrepancy between these versions and the original 
    IEEE and The Open Group Standard, the original IEEE and The Open Group Standard is the 
    referee document. The original Standard can be obtained online at 
    http://www.opengroup.org/unix/online.html.

    This notice shall appear on any product containing this material.
</nowiki>

Reception
The Free Software Foundation classes this as a free documentation license, stating that "This is a permissive non-copyleft free documentation license that is compatible with the GNU FDL."

Derivatives
Based on the FreeBSD Documentation License, the BSD Documentation License was created to contain terms more generic to most projects as well as reintroducing the 3rd clause that restricts the use of documentation for endorsement purposes (as shown in the New BSD License).

See also
BSD license
GNU Free Documentation License

References

External links

 The FreeBSD Documentation Project
 The FreeBSD Documentation License
 FreeBSD Documentation main page
 FreeBSD project main page

FreeBSD
Free content licenses